Saltney Ferry (Mold Junction) railway station was located on the western edge of the village of Saltney, Flintshire (now effectively a suburb of Chester).

History
Opened 1 June 1891 by the London and North Western Railway, it was served by what is now the North Wales Coast Line between Chester, Cheshire and Holyhead, Anglesey. The station was the most eastern one on the line to be found in Wales, being just  from the English border. The single island platform was reached by steps down from the road bridge.

Although technically on the North Wales Line the station was, for all practical purposes, on the Chester to Denbigh branch line as trains from the station generally only used the smaller line. The station however would have been busy with railway workers as the Mold Junction Motive power depot and employee cottages was right next to it. The station closed on 30 April 1962 and nothing of it remains, although the depot is still there.

References

Further reading

Disused railway stations in Flintshire
Former London and North Western Railway stations
Railway stations in Great Britain opened in 1891
Railway stations in Great Britain closed in 1962